Ranuccio Farnese (c. 1390 – 2 July 1450) was an Italian nobleman, feudal lord and condottiero.

Born in Ischia di Castro, he is considered the founder of the fortunes of the Farnese family. In 1416 Ranuccio succeeded his father as commander-in-chief of the Republic of Siena's troops, and defeated the Orsini of Pitigliano. In 1419 Pope Martin V appointed him as Senator of Rome, and three years later he received the fiefs of Tessennano and Piansano in the Papal States.

Also serving as Captain General of the Church under Eugene IV, Ranuccio obtained new lands in rewards of the creadits accumulated towards the Apostolic Chamber. These included Montalto di Castro, Canino and numerous others in the northern Lazio.

References

1390s births
1450 deaths
Farnese, Ranuccio
Ranuccio Vecchio
Farnese, Ranuccio Vecchio
Captains General of the Church